Lie: The Love and Terror Cult is the debut studio album by American musician and convicted murderer Charles Manson. It was released on vinyl on March 6, 1970, by Phil Kaufman, through a record label branded Awareness Records. Although not a commercial success, it retains a following among those interested in the Manson case, inspiring many cover versions and samples. The album includes some of Manson's best known songs, including "Look at Your Game, Girl" and "Cease to Exist" (the latter had been recorded by the Beach Boys as "Never Learn Not to Love").

The cover is a parody of the December 19, 1969, Life magazine cover, which featured Manson along with the headline "The Love and Terror Cult". The two covers are mostly identical; however, the "F" in "LIFE" has been deleted and the line "The dark edge of hippie life" has been removed. The date and price are replaced with the Awareness Records logo.

Background 

In 1968, Phil Kaufman, who had met Manson in prison, moved in briefly with Manson and his "Family". Kaufman continually urged Manson to record some of the songs that Manson had written. Over the summer of 1968, Manson attempted to construct an album with members of the Beach Boys. Carl and Brian Wilson co-produced about ten songs by Manson that he recorded at the Beach Boys' personal studio. These tapes remain unreleased, though the songs themselves may overlap with the material present on Lie: The Love and Terror Cult. In December 1968, the Beach Boys released their version of Manson's "Cease to Exist" as a single B-side, except the lyrics were changed and the title was altered to "Never Learn Not to Love", which angered Manson.

In August 1969, members of the Manson Family committed several murders and were apprehended three months later. While Manson was being held on the charges, he told Kaufman "please put out my music". According to Kaufman, Manson phoned him five days a week, even though he was allowed only three phone calls per day. Manson was "very anxious for his music to be heard".

Recording
According to the album's original sleeve notes, Lie: The Love and Terror Cult was recorded primarily at Gold Star Studios on August 8, 1968, with track B3, "Sick City", recorded September 11, 1967 in an unspecified location. Overdubs were recorded on August 9, 1968 somewhere in Van Nuys, Los Angeles. 2 tracks from the album, "Look at Your Game, Girl" and "Eyes of a Dreamer", were recorded in June 1967 at a demo session for Uni Records (a subsidiary of MCA). These 2 songs appeared on a privately pressed 45 rpm single and credited to "Silverhorn". When Phil Kaufman was mastering the Lie LP, he had to take these 2 tracks from a copy of the 45, as the master tapes were already lost.

Release 
After established record companies declined to become involved, Kaufman raised $3,000 and pressed 2,000 copies of an album entitled Lie: The Love and Terror Cult on March 6, 1970 through a record label called Awareness Records. It was distributed on the West Coast, by Trademark of Quality, the bootlegging group who released the first notable bootleg album, Great White Wonder, a collection of pirated Bob Dylan tapes. Consisting of the recordings made from 1967 to 1968, the album contained thirteen songs. These included "Cease to Exist", a song The Beach Boys had recorded in modified form as "Never Learn Not to Love". Its album cover is a copy of the December 19, 1969 Life front cover on which Manson had appeared, only with "Life" replaced with the word "Lie". Each of the original 2,000 copies came with a poster that was put out by "A Joint Venture" and that bore signatures of many prisoners and inmates, all supporting Manson and the Family. Only 300 sold. Having supposedly failed to recover his investment, Kaufman signed an agreement with New York-based ESP-Disk to distribute the album nationally.

During the 1991 Ron Reagan Jr. interview with Charles Manson, Manson stated that "That particular album was made off a little old $7 tape recorder, and it was put together as a promotion angle, and the guy made six or seven hundred dollars for that. My music is not on tape."

Covers and sampling 

"Cease to Exist" had been previously recorded by The Beach Boys under the name "Never Learn Not to Love", and it appears both on their 1969 album 20/20 and as the B-side of the single of "Bluebirds over the Mountain". Manson was not given co-writing credit. The Beach Boys' version includes such significant changes as the inclusion of a bridge that was not part of Manson's version, and the change of the line "Cease to exist" to "Cease to resist", which alters the meaning of the song.

Portions of the album have been sampled or covered by many other artists, such as Front Line Assembly. Many of the songs have also been re-recorded; a version of "Look at Your Game, Girl" appears as a hidden track on the Guns N' Roses cover album "The Spaghetti Incident?", while GG Allin covered "Garbage Dump" for his 1987 album You Give Love a Bad Name. Redd Kross and The Lemonheads have both covered "Cease to Exist". The Lemonheads recorded two other songs from the album, a version of "Home Is Where You're Happy" appeared on the 1988 album Creator and Evan Dando reappropriated some of the lyrics and melody of "Big Iron Door" into his song "Clang Bang Clang" (later re-recorded as "Left for Dead", which appears on the group's 1990 album Lovey). In 1989 actor Crispin Glover recorded a cover of "I'll Never Say Never to Always" (under the slightly altered title of "Never Say 'Never' to Always") for his debut album The Big Problem Does Not Equal the Solution, The Solution Equals Let It Be. The Pixies song 'Wave of Mutilation' from the 1989 Album Doolittle opens with the line "Cease to Exist". 

In the 1976 TV movie Helter Skelter, actor Steve Railsback, who portrayed Manson, sings “Garbage Dump” and two other songs from the Family Jams album.

The Brian Jonestown Massacre included a reworked version of "Arkansas" (called "Arkansas Revisited") on their 1999 EP Bringing It All Back Home – Again. Frontman Anton Newcombe frequently cites Manson as an influence, even claiming to have recorded with Manson.

An acoustic version of the song "Sick City" was recorded by Marilyn Manson, but this has never been officially released. The Marilyn Manson song "My Monkey", from the album Portrait of an American Family, contains samples of Charles Manson speaking, as well as lyrics from the track "Mechanical Man".

Devendra Banhart did a version of "Home Is Where You're Happy".

Musician Travis Miller, under his alias Lil Ugly Mane, released a song called "Iron Door" on his 2013 album Three Sided Tape Volume One, which features vocals samples from Manson's "Big Iron Door".

In the 2018 film Her Smell, the character of Becky Something, played by Elisabeth Moss, plays and sings a few lines from "Garbage Dump."

Reception
Retrospective reviews of the album have been largely positive, though critics have noted the difficulty of separating Manson's music from his subsequent crimes.

Allmusic described the best material on Lie as reminiscent of other folksingers of the era, particularly Jim Croce and José Feliciano. Raul D'Gama Rose of All About Jazz gave Lie 3 stars out of a possible 5 and described the album as "a significant musical document, considering it is a reflection of the popular counterculture" of the late 1960s; while it falls short of better contemporary work by Bob Dylan or John Sebastian, nonetheless several songs "stood up to the test of time" including "Look at Your Game, Girl", "Cease to Exist", "Eyes of a Dreamer" and "The More You Learn to Love.".

Track listing

Reissues (counterfeit not listed)  

All proceeds from one reissue of the album, released by Awareness Records, were donated to a California fund for victims of violent crime, as California law prohibited Manson himself from collecting any money or royalties for his work.

In 2006, the album was reissued by the revived ESP-Disk label. This version included twelve bonus tracks. A label employee confirmed that all artist royalties would go to the family of Wojciech Frykowski, whom members of the Manson Family was convicted of having murdered.

source:

Personnel 

 Charles Manson: lead vocals, rhythm guitar, timpani
 Bobby Beausoleil: electric guitar
 Steve "Clem" Grogan: electric bass
 Paul Watkins: French horn
 Catherine Share: violin, backup vocals
 Dianne Lake: recorder
 Mary Brunner: flute, vocals on Track 4
 Nancy Pitman: vocals on Track 6
 Sandra Good, Lynette Fromme, Nancy Pitman: backup vocals
 Producer – Phil Kaufman

References 

 Sources

External links 

 

1970 debut albums
Demo albums
Charles Manson albums
ESP-Disk albums
Albums recorded at Gold Star Studios